The Mausoluem of the Veterans of the Revolution (Spanish: Panteón de los Veteranos de la Revolución or the Mausoleo de los Veteranos de la Revolución) is a memorial and national monument dedicated to Filipino revolutionaries of the Philippine Revolution of the 1890s and the Philippine–American War situated inside the Manila North Cemetery in Manila, Philippines.

History

Early years
The memorial was commissioned through Executive Order No. 87, issued by then-Governor-General James F. Smith on August 28, 1908. Arcadio Arellano made the design for the monument in 1915 and the Asociacion de los Veteranos de la Revolucion and the city government of Manila was responsible for the construction of the structure. It was inaugurated on May 30, 1920.

Heritage designation
The monument was declared a National Historical Landmark on April 6, 1993.

Renovation
In October 2018, the monument was repainted with lead free paints by volunteers of the EcoWaste Coalition.

Design
The design of the monument was made by Arcadio de Guzmán Arellano, the brother of Juan Arellano. The neoclassical structure is a massive cubic structure on an elevated square podium. A shallow dome rests on a drum fenestrated by small openings to allow the circulation of air and primarily to let the natural light to come in. Swags, frets with key patterns, and human figures that represent grief to those who died fill up the façade.

Notable burials
Juan Arévalo, Son of Bonifacio Arévalo. Assembly Member, Declaration of Philippine Independence
Bonifacio Flores Arévalo, Filipino ilustrado, dentist, sculptor, propagandist, and an ardent patron of music and theater. Treasurer, La Liga Filipina. Founder, Sociedad Dental de Filipinas (now Philippine Dental Association)
Pio del Pilar, General of the Philippine Revolution

Former
Melchora Aquino, Grand Woman of the Katipunan, gave medical attention and encouraged the revolutionaries. Remains were later transferred to the Tandang Sora National Shrine in Quezon City.
Marcelo del Pilar, Filipino writer, lawyer, journalist, and freemason. One of the leaders of the Propaganda Movement. Remains were transferred to Marcelo H. del Pilar Shrine in Bulakan, Bulacan.

References

Philippine Revolution
Philippine–American War memorials
Buildings and structures in Santa Cruz, Manila
National Historical Landmarks of the Philippines
Monuments and memorials in the Philippines